The Jimmy and Rosalynn Carter School for Peace and Conflict Resolution (formerly known as the School for Conflict Analysis and Resolution or S-CAR) is a constituent college of George Mason University based near Washington, D.C., United States, specializing in peace and conflict studies with locations in Arlington, Fairfax, and Lorton, Virginia, as well as at the Mason Korea campus in Songdo, South Korea. On July 1, 2020, the School for Conflict Analysis and Resolution was renamed the Jimmy and Rossalyn Carter School for Peace and Conflict Resolution, following an announcement by the university in March 2020.

History 
The Carter School was founded in 1981 as the Center for Conflict Analysis, later named the Center for Conflict Analysis and Resolution (CCAR) and began offering a master's degree in Conflict Analysis and Resolution in 1983.  In 1988 it became the first academic institution to grant PhD's in Conflict Analysis and Resolution and rose to the status of Institute, becoming ICAR in 1989. In 2010, after a decade of growth and development, including the introduction of the undergraduate program and graduate certificate programs, it became the School for Conflict Analysis and Resolution (S-CAR). In 2020 the school was renamed in dedication to Nobel Peace Prize awarded humanitarian former U.S. president Jimmy Carter and his wife Rosalynn as the Jimmy and Rosalynn Carter School for Peace and Conflict Resolution.

Academic programs
PhD - Doctorate of Philosophy
MS - Master of Science in Conflict Analysis and Resolution
Concentration in Social Justice Advocacy and Activism
Concentration in Dynamics of Violence
Concentration in Inclusive Conflict Engagement
Concentration in Conflict-Sensitive Development and Resilience
Concentration in Media, Narrative, and Public Discourse
Individualized Concentration
BA/BS - Bachelor of Arts or Science in Conflict Analysis and Resolution
Concentration in Building Peace in Divided Societies
Concentration in Global Engagement
Concentration in Political and Social Action
Concentration in Justice and Reconciliation
Concentration in Interpersonal Dynamics
Concentration in Collaborative Leadership
Graduate Certificates in Conflict Analysis and Resolution
Conflict Analysis and Resolution Advanced Skills
Conflict Analysis and Resolution Collaborative Leadership in Community Planning
Prevention and Stabilization Contexts
World Religions and Peacebuilding
Collaborative Community Action
Dual master's degree with the University of Malta - Master of Science in Conflict Analysis and Resolution and Master of Arts in Conflict Resolution and Mediterranean Security
Dual Degree - Master of Science in Conflict Analysis and Resolution and Master of Social Work

Research and practice centers 
Center for World Religions, Diplomacy and Conflict Resolution
Center for Peacemaking Practice
Center for the Study of Gender and Conflict Resolution
Peace and Conflict Studies Center Asia (PACSC Asia)
Center for the Study of Narrative and Conflict Resolution
Mary Hoch Center for Reconciliation

Programs and projects 

Experiential Learning Program
Insight Conflict Resolution Program
Parents of the Field Project
Dialogue and Difference Project 
Zones of Peace Survey
Genocide Prevention Program
Genocide Watch
Sudan Task Group
South West Asia Group 
Program on Contentious Politics 
Program for the Prevention of Mass Violence

Notable alumni 
Mohammed Abu-Nimer, expert on conflict resolution and dialog for peace.  Professor at the American University School of International Service
Chad Ford, ESPN sports journalist and assistant professor at Brigham Young University – Hawaii (BYUH)
Deborah Hersman, former chair of the U.S. National Transportation Safety Board
Alma Jadallah, national and international conflict resolution practitioner and scholar, President and managing director of Kommon Denominator, Inc. 
January Makamba, Tanzanian politician and member of Parliament for Bumbuli constituency, Deputy Minister of Communication, Science and Technology

Current faculty 

Kevin Avruch - Henry Hart Rice Professor of Conflict Resolution and Professor of Anthropology
Sandra Cheldelin - Professor Emerita of Conflict Resolution
Charles Chavis
Sara Cobb - Drucie French Cumbie Professor of Conflict Analysis and Resolution
Leslie Dwyer
Thomas Flores
Marc Gopin - James H. Laue Professor of World Religions, Diplomacy and Conflict Resolution
Susan Hirsch - Vernon M. and Minnie Lynch Chair of Conflict Resolution
Karina Korostelina
Terrence Lyons
Christopher Mitchell - Professor Emeritus of Conflict Analysis and Resolution
Alpaslan Özerdem - Dean, Professor of Peace and Conflict Studies
Agnieszka Paczynska
Daniel Rothbart
Arthur Romano
Richard E. Rubenstein - University Professor of Conflict Resolution and Public Affairs
Solon Simmons
Roland B. Wilson - Program Coordinator and Professor at S-CAR Korea
Julie Shedd - Associate Dean of S-CAR
Susan Allen
Suzanne de Janasz - Visiting Professor of Management and Conflict Resolution
Douglas Irvin-Erickson
Tehama Lopez Bunyasi
Patricia Maulden
James Price
Mara Schoeny

Past faculty 

 Henry C. Barringer – U.S. Foreign Service Officer (Ret)
 Andrea Bartoli – Dean of the School of Diplomacy and International Relations at Seton Hall University
 Ben Broom
 John Burton – Former head of the Australian Foreign Office and founder of the Conflict Resolution Program at the University of London
 Mary E. Clark – former Drucie French Cumbie Chair in Conflict Resolution at George Mason University
 Kevin P. Clements – Professor of Peace and Conflict Studies at the University of Otago, New Zealand
 Dan Druckman
 Dennis Sandole (1941-2018) - former Professor of Conflict Resolution and International Relations
 Joe Gittler (1912-2005) 
 James H. Laue (1937–1993) – former Professor of Conflict Resolution and served on the U.S. Department of Justice's Community Relations Service (CRS)
 Michelle LeBaron 
 Tamra Pearson D'stree
 Joe Scimecca
 Wallace Warfield (1938–2010) – Professor of Conflict Analysis and Resolution, community mediator and acting director of the U.S. Department of Justice's New York Community Relations Service
 Bryant Wedge – Social psychiatrist, first director of CCR, worked for the State Department and the Arms Control and Disarmament Agency
 Tom Williams 
 Nadim Rouhana – Former Henry Hart Rice Professor of Conflict Resolution and Analysis

Distinguished fellows, visiting scholars and lecturers 
Elise M. Boulding
Kenneth E. Boulding
Ron Fisher
Johan Galtung
Herbert Kelman
Debra Kolb
Dean Pruitt
Anatol Rapoport
Peter Wallensteen

References

External links

George Mason University

George Mason University
Education in Fairfax County, Virginia
Education in Arlington County, Virginia
Peace and conflict studies
Peace education
Dispute resolution
Conflict (process)
1981 establishments in Virginia
Educational institutions established in 1981